Gabriel Francisco Schürrer Peralta (born 16 August 1971) is an Argentine football manager and former player who played as a central defender.

He spent the better part of his career in Spain, appearing for five different clubs in nearly one full decade (1996 to 2004, 2006–07) and amassing La Liga totals of 235 games and 13 goals.

Playing career

Club
Born in Rafaela, Santa Fe Province, Schürrer was best known for his eight-year stint in four La Liga clubs (two seasons apiece), most notably with Deportivo de La Coruña where he helped with 19 league games in the team's 1999–2000 league conquest. In 2004, he moved to Greece with Olympiacos FC, where he also remained two seasons.

After retiring at the end of the 2006–07 campaign at the age of almost 36, with Málaga CF, having played only ten competitive matches with the Andalusians in the second division, Schürrer returned to Argentina, serving as a youth coach at Club Atlético Lanús which he also represented as a player in the early 90s.

International
Schürrer gained four caps for Argentina, his debut coming in 1995. He was picked for the squad at that year's Copa América, as the national team exited in the quarterfinals against Brazil.

Coaching career
In November 2010, Schürrer was appointed head coach of Lanús' first team after the departure of Luis Zubeldía. He left in July 2012.

References

External links
 Argentine League statistics at Fútbol XXI  
 
 

1971 births
Living people
People from Rafaela
Argentine people of German descent
Argentine people of Spanish descent
Argentine footballers
Association football defenders
Argentine Primera División players
Club Atlético Lanús footballers
Atlético de Rafaela footballers
La Liga players
Segunda División players
Racing de Santander players
Deportivo de La Coruña players
UD Las Palmas players
Real Sociedad footballers
Málaga CF players
Super League Greece players
Olympiacos F.C. players
Argentina international footballers
1995 Copa América players
Argentine expatriate footballers
Expatriate footballers in Spain
Expatriate footballers in Greece
Argentine expatriate sportspeople in Spain
Argentine expatriate sportspeople in Greece
Argentine football managers
Expatriate football managers in Ecuador
Club Atlético Lanús managers
Argentinos Juniors managers
Crucero del Norte managers
Club Atlético Sarmiento managers
People named in the Panama Papers
C.S.D. Independiente del Valle managers
S.D. Aucas managers
C.D. Cuenca managers
Sportspeople from Santa Fe Province
Gimnasia y Esgrima de Jujuy managers